Makudi railway station (station code: MKDI) is a railway station on New Delhi–Chennai main line in Secunderabad railway division of South Central Railway zone of Indian Railways. It serves Makudi, a village in Chandrapur district in Maharashtra state in India. It is located at 180 m above sea level and has two platforms. Only passenger trains stop at this station. It is the last railway station in Maharashtra before crossing over to Telangana.

References

Secunderabad railway division
Railway stations in Chandrapur district